Shirangala( ಶಿರಂಗಾಲ ) is a village in Kodagu district of Karnataka state, India.

Location
Shirangala is located between Konanur and Kushalanagar towns on the bank of Cauvery river. Shirangala is 37 km from Madikeri and 19 km from Somvarpet. The distance from Shirangala to Mangalore and Bangalore are 185 km and 209 km respectively.

Post office
There is a post office in the village and the postal code is 571232.

Administration
Shirangala is administered as part of Somavarpet taluk in Kodagu district.

Villages and suburbs
 Kudige - 10 km
 Nerugalale - 14 km
 Mullusoge - 15 km
 Siddapurgate - 5 km
 Manajuru - 1.5 km
 Seegodu - 4 km

Image gallery

Notable People
Nandeesh Shirangala Bhujanga, Software Engineer (Australia)

References

Villages in Kodagu district